Azra is the debut album of the Yugoslav/Croatian rock band Azra, released through Jugoton in 1980.

In a list of top 100 Yugoslav rock albums compiled by the Croatian edition of the Rolling Stone magazine in 2015, Azra placed ninth.

Track listing
All music and lyrics written by Branimir Štulić.

Personnel 
Azra
Branimir Štulić – Guitars, lead vocals
Mišo Hrnjak – Bass
Boris Leiner – Drums

Additional musicians
Džimi, Harma, Gec, duo Baraccude – Backup vocals
Gec - Harmonica in track 2

Artwork
Jasmin Krpan – Design and photography
Martin Krun (Krunoslav Martinčević )– Logo

Production
Drago Mlinarec – Producer
Miljenko Grasso - Assistant engineer
Siniša Škarica - Executive producer
Recorded by Franjo Berner

References

Azra albums
1980 debut albums
Jugoton albums